In Ancient Greek epic tradition recounted in Homer's Odyssey, Polybus was the father of a suitor, Eurymachus, who was killed by Odysseus once he returned from his 10-year journey during the Trojan War.

Mythology 
Polybus was described as wise, contradictory to his foolish son. In Book XXII of the Odyssey, after Odysseus and Telemachus had slain most of the suitors, only six remained: Agelaus, Eurynomus, Amphimedon, Demoptolemus, Peisander and Polybus. The aforementioned Agelaus tried rousing the men to throw their spears collectively at the avengers, but Athena guided them elsewhere. Polybus was killed by the spear of the swineherd Eumaeus.

Note

References 

 Homer, The Odyssey with an English Translation by A.T. Murray, PH.D. in two volumes. Cambridge, MA., Harvard University Press; London, William Heinemann, Ltd. 1919. . Online version at the Perseus Digital Library. Greek text available from the same website.

Characters in the Odyssey